Dassa is a town and commune in Burkina Faso.

References

Populated places in the Centre-Ouest Region
Sanguié Province